Al-Iryani cabinet was the cabinet of Yemen formed by Abdulkarim al-Eryani from 16 May 1998 to 3 March 2001.

List of ministers

See also 

 Politics of Yemen

References 

Cabinets of Yemen
Iryani Cabinet